Ludwig Franz  (August 30, 1922 in Wörth an der Donau - July 2, 1990 in Rottach-Egern) was a German politician, representative of the Christian Social Union of Bavaria.
He was a member of the Bundestag from 1953 to 1976, representing Rosenheim.

See also
List of Bavarian Christian Social Union politicians

1922 births
1990 deaths
People from Regensburg (district)
Members of the Bundestag for Bavaria
Members of the Bundestag 1972–1976
Members of the Bundestag 1969–1972
Members of the Bundestag 1965–1969
Members of the Bundestag 1961–1965
Members of the Bundestag 1957–1961
Members of the Bundestag 1953–1957
Knights Commander of the Order of Merit of the Federal Republic of Germany
Members of the Bundestag for the Christian Social Union in Bavaria